Corynaea is the scientific name of two genera of organisms and may refer to:

Corynaea (moth), a genus of insects in the family Gelechiidae
Corynaea (plant), a genus of plants in the family Balanophoraceae